Rick Douglas Hayward (born February 25, 1966 in Toledo, Ohio) is a former professional ice hockey player.  He was drafted 162nd overall by the Montreal Canadiens in the 1986 NHL Entry Draft and played four games for the Los Angeles Kings during the 1990–91 NHL season, scoring no points and collecting five penalty minutes. As a youth, he played in the 1979 Quebec International Pee-Wee Hockey Tournament with a minor ice hockey team from Detroit.

Career statistics

References

External links
 

1966 births
Living people
American men's ice hockey defensemen
Anchorage Aces players
Capital District Islanders players
Cincinnati Cyclones (IHL) players
Cleveland Lumberjacks players
Frankfurt Lions players
Hull Olympiques players
Ice hockey players from Ohio
Los Angeles Kings players
Moncton Hawks players
Montreal Canadiens draft picks
Phoenix Roadrunners (IHL) players
Quebec Rafales players
Saginaw Hawks players
Sherbrooke Canadiens players
Salt Lake Golden Eagles (IHL) players
Sportspeople from Toledo, Ohio
Tallahassee Tiger Sharks players